HMS Tweed was a 32-gun sailing frigate of the fifth rate produced for the Royal Navy. She was designed in 1757 by Sir Thomas Slade, based on the lines of the smaller sixth rate HMS Tartar, but with a 10-foot midsection inserted. She was built in Blaydes Yard in Kingston-Upon-Hull.

Tweed was commissioned in April 1759 under Captain William Paston. On 15 March 1761 Tweed captured the French privateer Hardi, off Cape Finisterre. Hardi, of Bayonne, was armed with 10 guns and had a crew of 125 men. She had been out 18 days but had not captured anything. Tweed took Hardi into Lisbon.

In 1763 command passed to Captain Charles Douglas until Tweed paid off into reserve in April 1765. In November 1766 she was recommissioned under Captain Thomas Collingwood. In 1770 command passed to Captain George Collier until the ship paid off into reserve again in 1771.

The design was not considered to be very successful and no further ships of this class were built, while the Tweed herself was sold in 1776 following a survey in 1771 that indicated that she would require a Middling Repair taking £3,500 and nine months to complete.

Citations and references 
Citations

References
 Robert Gardiner, The First Frigates, Conway Maritime Press, London 1992. .
 David Lyon, The Sailing Navy List, Conway Maritime Press, London 1993. .

1759 ships
Fifth-rate frigates of the Royal Navy